The German name Frankenstein most commonly refers to various aspects of a 19th-century novel written by Mary Shelley, but was originally a place name.

Frankenstein may also refer to:

The novel
Frankenstein, the title of Mary Shelley's 1818 novel, subtitled The Modern Prometheus
Victor Frankenstein, the title character of Shelley's novel
Frankenstein's monster, the character that is the subject of Shelley's novel

Castles
Frankenstein Castle, Hesse, a 13th-century hilltop castle near Darmstadt, Germany, speculated to be the eponym for Shelley's novel
Frankenstein Castle, Palatinate, a 12th-century hilltop castle above the village of Frankenstein, Rhineland-Palatinate in the Palatinate Region of Germany

Film, TV and stage

Film
Frankenstein (1910 film), written and directed by J. Searle Dawley
Frankenstein (1931 film), directed by James Whale and the first to star Boris Karloff as the title monster
The Curse of Frankenstein, a 1957 British film by Hammer Films
Frankenstein 1970, a 1958 film directed by Howard W. Koch
Flesh for Frankenstein, titled "Andy Warhol's Frankenstein" for US release, a 1973 film directed by Paul Morrissey
Frankenstein (1973 film), a 1973 American made-for-television film written and produced by Dan Curtis
Frankenstein: The True Story, a 1973 British made-for-television film
Young Frankenstein, a 1974 film spoof directed by Mel Brooks
Frankenstein (1992 film), a made-for-television film
Mary Shelley's Frankenstein (film), a 1994 film directed by Kenneth Branagh
Frankenstein (2004 film), directed by Marcus Nispel
Frankenstein (2007 film), an adaptation shown on ITV
I, Frankenstein, a 2014 film based on the graphic novel by Kevin Grevioux, directed by Stuart Beattie
Frankenstein (2015 film), a straight-to-video adaptation starring Carrie-Anne Moss and Danny Huston
Victor Frankenstein (film), a 2015 adaptation directed by Paul McGuigan, starring James McAvoy and Daniel Radcliffe
Frankenstein (Death Race), a central character in the Death Race series of films

Television
Frankenstein (miniseries), a 2004 adaptation shown on the Hallmark Channel
Second Chance (2016 TV series), a Fox TV series originally titled Frankenstein
The Frankenstein Chronicles, a 2015 British television period crime drama series
Frankenstein's Monster's Monster, Frankenstein, a 2019 Netflix release, is a comedic mockumentary directed by Daniel Gray Longino and starring David Harbour

Theatre
Frankenstein (play), for various adaptions in stage
Frankenstein (2011 play), by Nick Dear, directed by Danny Boyle

Comics

Frankenstein (DC Comics), a character in DC Comics' Seven Soldiers
Frankenstein (Dell Comics), the star of a short-lived series by Dell Comics
Frankenstein's Monster (Marvel Comics), a character in Marvel Comics' The Monster of Frankenstein
Frankenstein (Prize Comics), a 1940 to 1954 version by writer-artist Dick Briefer
Franken Stein, a character in Gangan Comics' Soul Eater
Franken Stein, a character from Blood Lad
Frankenstein, a main character in the Korean manhwa series: Noblesse

Music

"Frankenstein" (instrumental), a 1973 rock instrumental by The Edgar Winter Group
"Frankenstein", a funk metal song by Clutch
"Frankenstein", a power metal song by Iced Earth
"Frankenstein", a pop-rock song by Aimee Mann
Frankenstein: The Modern Prometheus, an opera by Libby Larsen
Frankenstrat or Frankenstein, a guitar used by Eddie Van Halen
"Frankenstein", a song from the New York Dolls' self-titled debut album
 "Frankenstein", an upcoming opera by Mark Grey
 Gorgeous Frankenstein, an American horror punk/heavy metal band featuring Doyle Wolfgang von Frankenstein
 "Frankenstein and the Brain Surgeons," a rock and roll band formed by Eddie Carmel

Games
Frankenstein: The Monster Returns, a 1990 video game for the Nintendo Entertainment System
Frankenstein: Through the Eyes of the Monster, a 1995 graphic adventure computer game
Frankenstein (video game), a 1987 text adventure by CRL Group
Frankenstein's Monster (video game), a 1983 video game published by Data Age
 Frank N. Stein, a character from the video game Decap Attack

Places
Frankenstein, Missouri, an unincorporated community
Frankenstein, Rhineland-Palatinate, a municipality in Germany
Frankenstein, Saxony, a municipality in Germany
the former name of Ząbkowice Śląskie, a city in Lower Silesia Voivodeship, Poland

People
Frankenstein (rapper), Canadian hip hop artist
Frankenstein (wrestler) (1976-2010), Mexican professional wrestler
Alfred Frankenstein (1906–1981), art and music critic
Doyle Wolfgang von Frankenstein (born 1964), American lead guitarist of Doyle (ex-Misfits)
Jeff Frankenstein, keyboardist for Newsboys
Karl Frankenstein (1905–1990), Israeli professor in special education and pedagogy
"Frankenstein", nickname of Willi Mentz (1904–1978), German SS officer at Treblinka extermination camp

Other uses
Dean Koontz's Frankenstein, a series of modern suspense novels

See also
Frankenstein (comics)
House of Franckenstein, a Franconian noble family
Jacob August Franckenstein (1689–1733), 18th century encyclopedist
Frankie Stein, character from the doll franchise Monster High